Glane or Glâne may refer to:
 Glâne District, a district in the canton of Fribourg, Switzerland
 Glâne (river), a river in Switzerland that crosses part of the Canton of Fribourg
 Glane, Overijssel, a populated area in the municipality of Losser, Overijssel, Netherlands
 a district of Bad Iburg, in the district of Osnabrück, in Lower Saxony, Germany
 a river in Oradour-sur-Glane (commune), Haute-Vienne, France
 Glane (Ems), a river of North Rhine-Westphalia, Germany

See also
Glan (disambiguation)